Raja Aur Runk is a 1968 Bollywood film, directed by Kotayya Pratyagatma and starring Sanjeev Kumar and Kumkum.

It is an Indian adaptation of Mark Twain's 1881 novel, The Prince and the Pauper.

Synopsis
Raja Aur Runk is the story of a prince and a pauper. Two children, born on the same day at the same time: one to the king, Raja Sahib, and one to a poor man, Hariya (Ajit). The king is thrilled at the birth of Yuvraj, the heir to the throne, while Hariya is cynical about the birth of his son, Raja.

The children grow up looking identical, but there is a constant contrast in their lives and upbringing. One day, Raja runs away from home and somehow ends up in the palace, where he meets Yuvraj. The boys discover how different their lives are. Being tempted to see the world outside, Yuvraj changes identities with Raja and leaves the palace. They now struggle in vain to adjust to their new identities. Raja's mother (Nirupa Roy) and sister Sujjo (Nazima) are miserable with his changed behavior and the king is very distressed about Yuvraj. Sudhir (Sanjeev Kumar) comes in as a pivotal player in this saga of gripping twists and turns.

This Prasad Productions' costume drama has effective performances by Sanjeev Kumar, Nazima and child artiste Mahesh Kothare. The hit team of Anand Bakshi and Laxmikant Pyarelal created melodious songs like 'Tu Kitni Achchi Hai...O Maa', 'O Phirkiwali', 'Mera Naam Hai Chameli' and 'Sang Basanti Ang Basanti'.

Cast
Sanjeev Kumar as Sudhir/Vijay
Kumkum as Rajnartaki Madhvi
Ajit as Hariram Haria
Mukri as Sunder (Sudhir's friend)
Mohan Choti as Gangu (Hariram's friend)
Kamal Kapoor as Senapati Vikram
Mahesh Kothare as Yuvraaj Narendradev/Raja (as Master Mahesh)
Nirupa Roy as Shanta
Nazima as Sujata Sujjo
Aruna Rai as Chanchala (Madhvi's friend)
Bipin Gupta as Maharaj
Badri Prasad as Guru Shivanand

Soundtrack

The film's music was composed by Laxmikant Pyarelal with lyrics by Anand Bakshi.

 "Mera Naam Hai Chameli", Lata Mangeshkar
 "Mere Raja Mere Lal", Asha Bhosle & Usha Mangeshkar
 "Kanhaiya Kanhaiya", Lata Mangeshkar, Manna Dey, Kaumudi Munshi & Vinod Sharma
 "O Phirkiwali, Tu Kal Phir Aana, Nahin Phir Jaana", Mohammad Rafi
 "Sang Basanti, Ang Basanti, Rang Basanti Chha Gaya", Mohammad Rafi, Lata Mangeshkar, Manna Dey
 "Tu Kitni Achhi Hai", Lata Mangeshkar

References

External links

Indian children's films
1968 films
1960s Hindi-language films
Films scored by Laxmikant–Pyarelal
Films based on The Prince and the Pauper
Hindi remakes of Telugu films
Films directed by Kotayya Pratyagatma